The Anadarko Independent School District, also known as Anadarko Public Schools, is a school district based in Anadarko, Oklahoma United States.

In addition to Anadarko it serves Washita.

Schools
 Secondary schools
 Anadarko High School
 Anadarko Middle School
 Elementary schools
 Anadarko East Elementary School
 Anadarko Mission Elementary School
 Anadarko Sunset Elementary School

See also
 List of school districts in Oklahoma

References

External links
 Anadarko Public Schools
 Anadarko School District at School In Sites

School districts in Oklahoma
Education in Caddo County, Oklahoma